Bou Assel is a settlement in northwestern Morocco situated north of the city of Meknes.  Bou Assel is situated slightly south of the ancient city of Volubilis, initially settled by the Phoenicians and Romans over 2000 years ago.  The settlement is close to the river of the same name, Oued Bou Assel.

See also
 Douar Doukkara
 Douar Ain Chami
 Moulay Idris

References

External links
 Bou Assel, Morocco: map and coordinates

Populated places in Meknès Prefecture